The Zeiss Batis Sonnar T* 1.8/85mm is a full-frame (FE) portrait prime lens for the Sony E-mount, announced by Zeiss on April 22, 2015.

Though designed for Sony's full frame E-mount cameras, the lens can be used on Sony's APS-C E-mount camera bodies, with an equivalent full-frame field-of-view of 127.5mm.

Build quality
The lens designer is Takahiko Sakai of Tamron.

The lens features a minimalist weather resistant plastic construction with a matte black finish and a rubber focus ring. Along with the Zeiss Batis Distagon T* 25mm F2, the Batis Sonnar 85mm was one of the first two lenses in which the traditional distance scale on the lens is replaced with an OLED display. The OLED display is integrated into the top of the lens barrel, and highlights the focus distance and depth of field range of the lens, which can be set to display at all times, never, or only when focusing manually.

Image quality
The lens is renowned for having exceptional sharpness and creamy smooth bokeh.

See also
  List of Zeiss Batis lenses
 List of third-party E-mount lenses
 Zeiss Sonnar
 Sony FE 85mm F1.8
 Sony FE 85mm F1.4 GM

References

External links

Official sites

Reviews of this lens
 

 

 

 

Camera lenses introduced in 2015
Batis 1.8 85